Lee Hyun-jung (born September 27, 1978) is a South Korean curler.

At the international level, she is two-time Pacific champion curler.

Teams

References

External links

1978 births
Living people
South Korean female curlers
Pacific-Asian curling champions
Competitors at the 2003 Winter Universiade
Asian Games medalists in curling
Curlers at the 2003 Asian Winter Games
Medalists at the 2003 Asian Winter Games
Asian Games silver medalists for South Korea